The Miners Museum is located in Glace Bay, Nova Scotia. The main building of the museum contains an exhibit area dedicated to the history of coal mining in Cape Breton.  Underneath the museum is the Ocean Deeps Colliery which is a coal mine that visitors can tour with retired miners as guides. It also has a mine simulator  that virtually transports visitors to the No. 24 colliery.
Outside the museum is The Miners Village. The Village consists of a number of historical buildings depicting the homes and lives of miners.

The museum is also home to the Miners’ Village Restaurant and the Men of the Deeps.

References

External links

  Official Site
  Cape Breton Miners' Museum
 Cape Breton Miners Museum set to celebrate 50th anniversary

Museums in Cape Breton County
National Historic Sites in Nova Scotia
History museums in Nova Scotia
Buildings and structures in the Cape Breton Regional Municipality